Breaking the Surface: The Greg Louganis Story is a 1997 television film about diver Greg Louganis based on the 1996 best-selling book Breaking the Surface co-written by Greg Louganis and Eric Marcus that stayed on top of the New York Times Best Seller list for 5 weeks.  This was Steven Hilliard Stern's final directed film before dying in 2018.

Plot
In Seoul, 1988, Greg Louganis (played by Mario Lopez) hits the diving board while plunging towards the water cutting his head open. Splashing into the water Greg begins to have flashbacks: as a young kid being ridiculed by neighborhood bullies; his adoptive father (played by Michael Murphy) is not accepting and overbearing; winning the silver medal; the 1982 world championship; two gold medals in the 1984 Summer Olympics in Los Angeles; the struggles of an abusive relationship with Tom Barrett; his father's terminal cancer; Tom's losing battle with AIDS and Greg's own HIV positive status. After doctors in Seoul stitch Greg's head wound, he returns to competition and picks up two more gold medals. After his father's death and Tom's lost AIDS' battle, Greg decides to come out and go public with every aspect of his life as a gay athlete.

Cast
Mario Lopez as Greg Louganis
Michael Murphy as Pete Louganis
Rosemary Dunsmore as Frances Louganis
Jeffrey Meek as Tom Barrett
Megan Leitch as Megan Neyer
Jonathan Scarfe as Keith
Fulvio Cecere as John Anders
Patrick David as Young Greg Louganis
Rafael Rojas III as Greg (age 9)
Bruce Weitz as Ron O'Brien
Gregor Trpin as Scott Cranham
Greg Louganis as himself

Awards
Mario López was nominated for an ALMA Award for "Outstanding Individual Performance in a Made-for-Television Movie or Mini-Series in a Crossover Role".

External links
 *

1997 drama films
1997 LGBT-related films
1997 television films
1997 films
American LGBT-related television films
Films about Olympic swimming and diving
Films about the 1984 Summer Olympics
Films directed by Steven Hilliard Stern
Films set in the 1960s
Films set in 1969
Films set in the 1980s
Films set in 1982
Films set in 1984
Films set in 1988
Gay-related films
HIV/AIDS in television
LGBT-related sports drama films
LGBT-related coming-of-age films
Sports films based on actual events
American drama television films
1990s American films